Saif ad-Din Qutuz (died 24 October 1260), also romanized as Kutuz or Kotuz and fully al-Malik al-Muẓaffar Sayf ad-Dīn Quṭuz, was a military leader and the third or fourth of the Mamluk Sultans of Egypt in the Turkic line. He reigned as Sultan for less than a year, from 1259 until his assassination in 1260, but served as the de facto ruler for two decades.

Sold into slavery in Egypt, he rose to become vice-sultan for over 20 years, becoming the power behind the throne. He was prominent in defeating the Seventh Crusade, which invaded Egypt in 1249–1250. When Egypt was threatened by the Mongols in 1259, he took control of the military and deposed the reigning sultan, 15-year-old Sultan Al-Mansur Ali. The centers of Islamic power in Syria and Baghdad were conquered by the Mongols, and the center of the Islamic Empire moved to Egypt, which became their next target. Qutuz led an Egyptian Mamluk army north to confront the Mongols, having made a pact with Egypt's long-time enemy the Crusaders.

The Battle of Ain Jalut was fought on 3 September 1260 in southeastern Galilee, between the Egyptian Mamluk army and the Mongols. The Mongols were crushingly defeated by Qutuz's forces, in what has been considered a historical turning point. Qutuz was assassinated by a fellow Mamluk leader, Baibars, on the triumphant return journey to Cairo. Although Qutuz's reign was short, he is known as one of the most popular Mamluk sultans in the Islamic world and holds a high position in Islamic history.

Background

Qutuz was a Turkic prince from Persia, captured by the Mongols during the fall of the Khwarazmian dynasty , he was taken to Damascus where he was sold to an Egyptian slave merchant who then sold him to Aybak, the Mamluk sultan in Cairo. According to some sources, Qutuz claimed that his original name was Mahmud ibn Mamdud and he was descended from Ala ad-Din Muhammad II, a ruler of the Khwarazmian Empire.

He became the most prominent Mu'izi Mamluk of Sultan Aybak, and then became his vice-sultan in 1253. Aybak was assassinated in 1257 and Qutuz remained as vice-sultan for Aybak's son al-Mansur Ali. Qutuz led the Mu'izi Mamluks who had arrested Aybak's widow Shajar al-Durr and installed al-Mansur Ali as the new sultan of Egypt. In November 1257 and April 1258, he defeated raids from the forces of al-Malik al-Mughith of Al-Karak which were supported by the Bahriyya Mamluks. The raids caused a dispute among the Bahriyya Mamluks in Al-Karak as some of them wanted to support their followers in Egypt.

In February 1258, the Mongol army sacked Baghdad, massacred its inhabitants and killed the Abbasid Caliph Al-Musta'sim. They then advanced towards present-day Syria which was then ruled by the Ayyubid ruler an-Nasir Yusuf, who received a threatening letter from Hulagu. Vice-Sultan Qutuz and the Egyptian Emirs were alarmed by a message from an-Nasir Yusuf in which he appealed for immediate help from Egypt. The emirs assembled at the court of the 15-year-old Sultan Al-Mansur Ali and Qutuz told them that because of the seriousness of the situation, Egypt should have a strong and capable sultan who could fight the Mongols. On 12 November 1259, Al-Mansur Ali was deposed by Qutuz. When Qutuz became the new sultan, he promised the emirs that they could install any other sultan after he defeated the Mongols.

Qutuz kept Emir Faris ad-Din Aktai al-Mostareb as the Atabeg of the Egyptian army and began to prepare for battle.

Mongol threat

Hulagu and his forces were proceeding towards Damascus. Some of the Syrian emirs suggested to an-Nasir Yusuf to surrender and submit to Hulagu as the best solution was to save themselves and Syria. Baibars, who was present at the meeting, was upset by the suggestion, and the Mamluks decided to kill an-Nasir Yusuf that night. However, he managed to escape with his brother to the citadel of Damascus. Baibars and the Mamluks then left Syria, travelling to Egypt where they were warmly welcomed by Sultan Qutuz, who granted Baibars the town of Qalyub. When an-Nasir Yusuf heard that the Mongol army was approaching Aleppo, he sent his wife, his son and his money to Egypt. The population of Damascus and other Syrian towns began to flee. After besieging Aleppo for seven days, the Mongols sacked it and massacred its population. When an-Nasir Yusuf heard about the fall of Aleppo he fled to Egypt, leaving Damascus and its remaining population defenseless, but Qutuz denied him entry. An-Nasir Yusuf thus stayed on the border of Egypt, while his emirs deserted him and proceeded into the country. Sultan Qutuz ordered the seizing of an-Nasir Yusuf's jewelry and money, which were sent to Egypt with his wife and servants. Sixteen days after the fall of Aleppo to the Mongols, Damascus surrendered without a fight. An-Nasir Yusuf was taken prisoner by the Mamluks and sent to Hulagu.

With the centers of Islamic power in Syria and Baghdad conquered, the center of the Islamic power transferred to Egypt, and became Hulagu's next target. Hulagu sent messengers to Cairo with a threatening letter, urging Qutuz to surrender and submit to the Mongols. Qutuz's response was to execute the messengers. They were sliced in half, and their heads were mounted on the Bab Zuweila gate in Cairo. Then, rather than waiting for the Mongols to attack, Qutuz decided to raise an army to engage them outside of Egypt. Moroccans who resided in Egypt fled westward, while Yemenis escaped to Yemen and Hejaz.

Qutuz went to Al-Salihiyya and assembled his commanders to decide on when to march against the Mongols. But the emirs showed timidity. Qutuz shamed them into joining him, with the statement "Emirs of the Muslims, for some time now you have been fed by the country treasury and you hate to be invaded. I will go alone and who likes to join me should do that and who does not like to join me should go back home, but who will not join will carry the sin of not defending our women."

Qutuz ordered Baibars to lead a force to Gaza to observe the small Mongol garrison there, which Baibars easily defeated. After spending a day in Gaza, Qutuz led his army along the coast towards Acre, a city that remains a remnant of the Kingdom of Jerusalem Crusader state. The Crusaders were traditional enemies of the Mamluks, and had been approached by the Mongols about forming a Franco-Mongol alliance. However, that year the Crusaders recognized the Mongols as the greater threat. Qutuz suggested a military alliance with the Crusaders against the Mongols, but the Crusaders opted to stay neutral. They did, however, allow Qutuz and his forces to travel unmolested through Crusader territory, and to camp and resupply near the Crusader stronghold of Acre. Qutuz and his army stayed there for three days until they heard that the Mongols had crossed the Jordan River, at which point Qutuz and Baibars led their forces to meet the Mongols at Ain Jalut.

Battle of Ain Jalut

The Battle of Ain Jalut was fought on 3 September 1260 and was one of the most important battles and a turning point in history. In 1250, only ten years before the battle, the Bahariyya Mamluks (Qutuz, Baibars and Qalawun) led Egypt against the Seventh Crusade of King Louis IX of France. The Mongol army at Ain Jalut was led by Kitbuqa, a Nestorian Christian Naiman Turk, and accompanied by the Christian king of Cilician Armenia and also by the Christian prince of Antioch. After the fall of Khawarezm, Baghdad and Syria, Egypt was the last citadel of Islam in the Middle East, and the existence of crusade beach-heads along the coast of the Levant presented a serious menace to the Islamic world. Therefore, the future of Islam and of the Christian west as well depended on the outcome of that battle.

Baibars, who was known to be a swift commander, led the vanguard and succeeded in his maneuver and lured the Mongol army to Ain Jalut where the Egyptian army led by Qutuz waited. The Egyptians at first failed to counter the Mongol attack and were scattered after the left flank of their army suffered a severe damage but Qutuz stood firm, he threw his helmet to the air and shouted "O Islam" and advanced towards the damaged side followed by his unit. The Mongols were pushed back and fled to a vicinity of Beit She'an, they were quickly followed by Qutuz's forces, but they managed to gather and returned to the battlefield making a successful counterattack. Qutuz cried loudly three times "O Islam! O God grant your servant Qutuz a victory against the Mongols". The Mongols with their Christian and Muslim allies were then defeated by Qutuz's army and fled to Syria where they became prey for the local population. Qutuz kissed the ground and prayed while the soldiers collected the booty. Kitbuqa, the Commander of the Mongol army, was killed and his head was sent to Cairo.

This was the first defeat suffered by the Mongols since they attacked the Islamic world. They fled from Damascus, then from the whole of the northern Levant. Qutuz entered Damascus with his army and sent Baibars to Homs to liquidate the remaining Mongols. While Alam ad-Din Sonjar was nominated by Qutuz as the sultan's deputy in Damascus, Qutuz granted Aleppo to al-Malik al-Said Ala'a ad-Din as the Emir of Mosul; also a new Abbasid Caliph was about to be installed by Qutuz. The Levant region from the border of Egypt to the river Euphrates was freed from the Mongols' control. After this victory the Mamluks stretched their sovereignty to the Levant and were recognized by the Ayyubids and the others as legitimate rulers. When Hulagu heard about the defeat of the Mongol Army he executed an-Nasir Yusuf near Tabriz. Hulagu kept threatening the Mamluk Sultanate, but soon he was struck hard by conflicts with the Mongols of the Golden Horde, in the western half of the Eurasian Steppe during the Berke–Hulagu war. Hulagu died in 1265 and would never avenge the defeat of the Mongols at Ain Jalut.

The battle is also notable for being the earliest known battle where explosive hand cannons (midfa in Arabic) were used. These explosives were employed by the Mamluk Egyptians in order to frighten the Mongol horses and cavalry and cause disorder in their ranks. The explosive gunpowder compositions of these cannons were later described in Arabic chemical and military manuals in the early 14th century.

Assassination
On his way back to Cairo, Qutuz was assassinated while on a hunting expedition in Salihiyah. According to both modern and medieval Muslim historians such as al-Maqrizi, Baibars was involved in the assassination. Al-Maqrizi further explains that the emirs who struck down Qutuz were Emir Badr ad-Din Baktut, Emir Ons, and Emir Bahadir al-Mu'izzi. While Western historians mentions that Baibars were in on the conspiracy and assigned him direct responsibility. Muslim chroniclers from the Mamluk era stated that Baibars' motivation was either to avenge the killing of his friend, the leader of the Bahariyya Faris ad-Din Aktai during Sultan Aybak's reign; or due to Qutuz's decision to grant Aleppo to al-Malik al-Said Ala'a ad-Din the Emir of Mosul, instead of to Baibars as had promised to him before the Battle of Ain Jalut.

Qutuz was first buried in the town of Al-Qusair and then reburied in a cemetery in Cairo, Egypt. Baibars returned to a Cairo which were undergoing celebrations on the victory over the Mongols, where he became the new sultan. Baibars was at once admired by the people as he revoked the war taxes which had been imposed by Qutuz.

Coins
The coins during the reign of Qutuz are unique in the history of Mamluk coinages as no other names except his names and titles were inscribed on it: al-Malik al-Muzafar Saif al-Donya wa al-Din ("The victorious king, sword of the temporal world and of the faith") and al-Muzafar Saif al-Din ("The victorious sword of faith").

See also 
 List of rulers of Egypt
 Mosque of Amr ibn al-As

Notes

References

Sources
 Abu al-Fida, The Concise History of Humanity
 Al-Maqrizi, Al Selouk Leme'refatt Dewall al-Melouk, Dar al-kotob, 1997.
 Al-Maqrizi, al-Mawaiz wa al-'i'tibar bi dhikr al-khitat wa al-'athar, Matabat aladab, Cairo 1996, .
 
 Al-Qalqashandi, Sobh al-Asha Fi sena'at al-Insha, Dar Alkotob, Cairo 1913.
 
 Chronicles of the Crusades: being contemporary narratives of the crusade of Richard Coeur de Lion by Richard of Devizes and Geoffrey de Vinsauf; and of the crusade of St. Louis by Lord John de Joinville. (London: H. G. Bohn, 1848; reissued New York: AMS Press, 1969) 
 Fahmi, Dr. Abd al-Rahman, al-Niqood al-Arabiya (Arabic coins), Mat Misr, Cairo 1964.
 Hassan, O, Al-Zahir Baibars, Dar Alamal, Cairo 1997, .
 Holt, P. M.; Lambton, Ann; Lewis, Bernard (2005) The Cambridge History of Islam, Vol. 1A: The Central Islamic Lands from Pre-Islamic Times to the First World War, Cambridge University Press, .
 Ibn Aybak Al-Dwedar, Kinz al-Dorar wa Jamia al-Ghorar, Hans Robert Roemer, Cairo.
 Ibn Taghri, al-Nujum al-Zahirah Fi Milook Misr wa al-Qahirah, al-Hay'ah al-Misreyah 1968.
 
 Mawsoa Thakafiya (Culture encyclopedia), Franklin Publishing, Cairo 1973.
 Perry, Glenn E. (2004) The History of Egypt, Greenwood Publishing Group, .
 Qasim, Abdu Qasim, Dr., Asr Salatin AlMamlik (era of the Mamluk Sultans), Eye for human and social studies, Cairo 2007.
 Riley-Smith, Jonathan (2001) The Oxford Illustrated History of the Crusades, Oxford University Press US, .
 Shayyal, Jamal, Prof. of Islamic history, Tarikh Misr al-Islamiyah (History of Islamic Egypt), dar al-Maref, Cairo 1266, .
 The New Encyclopædia Britannica, Macropædia, H.H. Berton Publisher, 1973–1974.
 Toynbee, Arnold J., Mankind and mother earth, Oxford University Press, 1976.
 .

External links 
 Map of Qalyub
 Al-Salihiyah on Map
 Map of the location of the Battle of Ain Jalut

1260 deaths
Egyptian nobility
Bahri sultans
Murdered Mamluk sultans
Assassinated Egyptian people
Muslims of the Seventh Crusade
Year of birth unknown
13th-century Mamluk sultans
1221 births
Anushtegin dynasty